Realm of the Mad God  is a massively multiplayer online shooter video game created by Wild Shadow Studios and currently owned and developed by DECA Games. It was in public beta from January 2010 and the browser version launched on June 20, 2011.  On February 20, 2012 the game was made available on the digital distribution platform Steam for Microsoft Windows and OS X.

The game has been described as a "massively-multiplayer cooperative bullet hell shooter" with an 8-bit pixelated art style. Players control characters who have been transported to the realm of Oryx (the titular Mad God) to become food for his many minions and abominations, which the players must dispatch. Central to the design of the game is the fact that character death is permanent. Upon death, the player's character is lost along with all of its carried equipment, although the player can store a number of items for safekeeping in a limited capacity vault away from danger. Different character choices in class also help make the game more diverse and help to support teamwork.

The game is free-to-play with optional in-game micro-transactions. Items which can be bought with optional transactions vary from high-level equipment, pets that provide aid to the player (by attacking enemies, healing the player, etc.), increased storage space, and a variety of aesthetic features such as skins, cloths and dyes.

Wild Shadow Studios was acquired by Kabam in June 2012, and obtained Realm of the Mad God in the acquisition. Kabam maintained the game until July 2016, when they sold it to DECA Games.

This game client was originally written in Flash and could be played in-browser on the official site, on Kongregate, or could be downloaded from Steam. Due to the discontinuation of Adobe Flash Support by 2020, it was announced on June 12, 2018, that a remastered version of the client built using the Unity game engine was under development, which was first released to the public through an Open Beta on April 15, 2020, and was officially released as Realm of the Mad God Exalt on July 22, 2020.

Gameplay
The HUD on the right-hand side displays a mini-map of the player's current server as well as the current character's statistics and inventory. The mini-map of the realm is initially blank, but areas can be revealed as a player traverses through the map. Player and NPC chat appears the lower left corner of the screen.

The game consists of players firing projectiles and destroying enemies to earn experience, fame, and better equipment. A character moves around using the WASD keys and uses the mouse to aim and shoot. Contrary to usual practice in MMOs, the experience for killing monsters is awarded fully to each player present, rather than divided. Because of this, it is generally advantageous to group up when fighting enemies. Players also have the ability to instantly teleport to any other player on the map under a cooldown of 10 seconds. In addition, players are able to escape to the safety of the Nexus, a safe area where characters can't be killed, at the push of a button (default keys are R and F5). The controls can be changed in the options menu.

After a certain amount of experience has been earned, the player levels up and their attributes are raised, allowing them to become stronger, fight more powerful enemies, and unlock more classes. The maximum level a player can achieve on any character is level 20, at which point the character stops receiving attribute gains from levelling. In addition to experience points, the player earns "fame" on their character, which increase the player's rank (represented by how many "stars" the player has earned) when enough fame is earned on any single character. If a character has earned a particularly high amount of fame, the character may be placed on the game's leaderboards upon its death. Character death is permanent; when a character dies, all its statistics and all the equipment it was carrying is lost. The player earns fame from their character's deaths depending on how much "base" fame they accrued and whether or not they fulfilled specific conditions that further increase fame gain from a dead character. This earned fame is tallied and added to the player's overall balance, and it can be used to purchase certain items in-game or to feed your pet with items.

Players begin their game sessions in the Nexus. The Nexus consists of multiple sections featuring, among other things: a marketplace, healing fountains, and portals to enter the many realms within the game. The marketplace is scattered across the central Nexus and players commonly use this area to trade with other players as well as purchase items being sold in the Nexus using Realm Gold (the in-game currency that is purchasable with real money). Occasionally, packages may appear in the Nexus that can be purchased with Fame rather than Realm Gold. North of the marketplace is a large room that contains multiple portals leading to the "realms" (game map instances present on the server). Each of these realms are named after powerful monsters in the game (i.e. Medusa, Djinn, etc.). The capacity of each realm is 85 people at once, and a full realm cannot be entered until a player in it dies or leaves.

During gameplay, the player is directed to "quest" monsters which are indicated by a red marker at the edge of the game window. As their character levels up in the realm, they are guided from the "Beaches" and "Lowlands" areas at the edges of the map, through the "Midlands" and "Highlands," and to the more difficult "Mountains" (also known in-game as the "Godlands") in the center of the map. The Mountains host powerful monsters known as "Gods", which are significantly stronger than the other foes in the Realm but also provide more experience and better loot. Defeating certain quest enemies allow more powerful "event" bosses to spawn, which are unique and often once-per-realm bosses that can be killed to obtain higher-tier loot and open portals to rare dungeons.

Killing higher-level monsters such as Gods, event bosses, or dungeon bosses can grant the player permanent stat boost potions. These potions allow the player to improve their characters' stats even after reaching the highest level, and the character can consume these potions until the corresponding attribute is maxed out. These stats increases are permanent and will be maintained for the life of that character. The quality of the character's gravestone corresponds to the amount of stats they had maxed at the moment they had died.

Once all of the quest heroes and event bosses in a realm are defeated, Oryx closes the realm off, preventing players from entering the Realm. After a delay, players are then teleported to Oryx's Castle, a high-level dungeon where they take down his minions and make their way into the castle. After a confrontation with the castle guardians, players can face off against Oryx himself in his chamber. Oryx's Castle also contains an alternative encounter that triggers when a specific condition is met, granting the players that choose this option over Oryx to fight a special boss and access several unique boss-only dungeons. Oryx has three, increasingly powerful forms. When Oryx's first form is defeated in his chamber, he drops a locked portal to the Wine Cellar, where his second form resides. The portal can only be unlocked if one of the players surviving the first Oryx fight happen to have an "incantation" that unlocks the Wine Cellar, which drops from various enemies throughout the game. Upon being unlocked, the players can storm the Mad God's heavily guarded Wine Cellar and face the true Oryx, who is significantly stronger than his previous incarnation and wields a completely new set of attacks. The rewards of the Oryx boss fights are a large amount of fame and some rare and useful equipment. After Oryx's second form is defeated, players possessing three special rune items can use them to reveal the portal to Oryx's Sanctuary, the most difficult area in the game as of July 2020. In the Sanctuary, players can encounter Oryx's third and most powerful form, who drops some of the most powerful items in the game.

One major gameplay element of Realm of the Mad God is dungeon crawling. Players can gain access to dungeons by either killing the monster that naturally drops the dungeon portal, or by a player opening a dungeon portal through the use of a key (often purchased with Realm Gold). Most dungeons are generated with a random layout (though some dungeons do exist with a predetermined layout), so they will have a different layout with every visit. Dungeons range greatly in difficulty, from very easy beginner dungeons like the Pirate Cave or Spider Den, to advanced dungeons like the Lost Halls and Oryx's Sanctuary that are intended for very powerful characters and experienced players. Most mid-to-high level dungeons will provide the player with stat boost potions, some even guaranteeing such potions in certain conditions. The dungeon monsters also have a chance to drop equipment for the player. In addition to these drops, dungeon bosses typically provide the player with a small possibility of obtaining unique and rare pieces of equipment that cannot be found anywhere else. Some of these rare items may prove more useful to the player depending on their preferences or the type of item.

Realm of the Mad God currently has 18 different playable classes. Players begin with only the Wizard class unlocked and successively unlock the remaining classes as they reach level 20 with each class. There are six different weapon types and three different armor types for each class to use. In addition, each class possesses a special ability that is exclusive to that class. Depending on the class and/or item equipped, an ability can deal burst damage, inflict debuffs onto enemies, buff allies, heal allies, or perform a defensive function.

Items are generally classified into tiers, with higher tier items having better stats. Some items are not classified by tier and are thus either given an "untiered" designation, or a "set tiered" designation if they are part of an item set. Item examples include weapons, armor, rings, abilities, limited use items, and April Fools' Day accouterments. Items are typically dropped in bags when the monster who was "carrying" it is killed. The loot bags come in the following color tiers (lowest to highest): brown, pink, purple, basket, gold, cyan, blue, orange, red, and white. Better equipment is typically seen in a higher tiered loot bag. The rarest untiered items tend to drop in white bags, and are frequently referred to in the community as "white bag items" or "whites" by this association. Many of these "white bag" items can completely change the way a class is played, and are highly sought after by players. All loot bags from purple tier up are "soulbound," and will only be seen by the player for whom it dropped. Many items, such as stat increase potions and most tiered equipment, can be traded to other players, even if they originally dropped in a soulbound bag. However, most untiered equipment is soulbound and thus can not be traded.

The game features guilds that each allow for a maximum of 50 players and 5 ranks. A guild costs the founding player 1000 fame to name and create, and has a guild hall which can be accessed by members of the guild. Upon a member's death, guild fame is earned proportionally to the amount of fame that the player earned. Guilds can buy upgrades such as larger guild halls and cosmetic features with the guild fame. The first upgrade costs 10,000 guild fame, the second costs 100,000 guild fame, and the third costs 250,000 guild fame.

A vital part of Realm of the Mad God gameplay are pets, allies which follow players throughout the realm. Each player can have up to one pet active at a time, and each pet can have up to three skills simultaneously with skill levels 1-100. Skills are determined upon hatching the pet from an egg. There are five rarity levels for pets: common, uncommon, rare, legendary, and divine. A pet's rarity depends on the rarity of the egg hatched, and each rarity has access to higher levels and more skills (of the three). Pets of lower rarity can upgrade upon fusion with other pets of the same rarity. However, to maximize skill levels, it's optimal to augment the main pet until it cannot grow anymore, then max out the first ability of another pet of the same rarity and identical first ability before fusing pets. Pet skills range from enemy debuffs to attacks. Unfortunately, most pet skills will prove to be insignificant in any fight. The most ideal pet will have the Heal and Magic Heal abilities to replenish player health and mana.

Development

The game was originally created by Alex Carobus and Rob Shillingsburg, founders of Wild Shadow Studios, for indie game forum TIGSource's "Assemblee Competition" in October 2009, which limited the competitors to a very small sample of art resources. The developers described the aim of the game was to "shake things up by breaking as many MMO 'rules' as we could" It was noticed and received a good response from players, prompting the developers to work on a full game. The game was finally launched in a beta stage on January 10, 2010.

Following the initial launch, Spry Fox joined the development team, helping bring the game to a full release out of beta on June 20, 2011.

To help fund the game's development, optional microtransactions were added to the game, drawing a mixed response from players. The developers defended the microtransactions, saying "they seemed like the most convenient, customer-friendly way to pay for the game... those that passionately love the game, can spend as much as they want, helping us to grow the game over time."

The game has been receiving updates "every few weeks" since its release, with additions including "dungeons, new character classes, hundreds of items and monsters, bank space, pets, clothing, guilds" and more.

On February 20, 2012, the game was made available on digital distribution platform Steam.

After a year of post-release game development, Wild Shadow Studios were acquired by Kabam in June 2012, with part of the deal being that Spry Fox sold their stake in the game to Kabam. Wild Shadow co-founders Alex Carobus and Rob Shillingsburg both left to pursue other opportunities after the acquisition, while Wild Shadow employee Willem Rosenthal stayed on the development team through the transition until June 2013. Spryfox went on to develop Steambirds Alliance as a spiritual successor.

On June 23, 2016, Kabam announced that they would be transferring Realm of the Mad God to DECA Games on July 15.

On June 12, 2018, DECA Games revealed that development for a Unity version of the client had begun. A trailer for this was released on December 13, 2019, and revealed the Unity version would be named Realm of the Mad God Exalt. A closed beta for the new client started on the March 19, 2020, given to Supporters of the game who had gotten to Supporter rank 2. On April 15, 2020, the open beta client was released. On July 22, 2020, the Unity client was officially released and became the default method of playing the game. The Flash client was discontinued on September 23, 2020, and remained playable until then.

Reception

Realm of the Mad God received generally positive reception from critics, with a Metacritic rating of 82/100 and GameRanking rating of 85.6%.

IGN gave the game a score of 8/10, stating that "this unusual free-to-play MMO hybrid is worth every second of your spare time", criticising, however, the controls, saying "it's a shame that the controls aren't as tight as they should be for the arcade-style shooter gameplay." Eurogamer gave a rating of 9/10, calling the game "superb" and "the perfect game for people who love the idea of raiding, but can't afford to invest the time all MMOs require before the really good stuff", and PC Gamer described the game as "Unrepentantly simplistic and fun", and "one of the most distinctive multiplayer experiences around" in their 89% score review.

RPGFan criticised the simplistic nature of the game, saying "the game currently feels a little bare-bones", adding, however, that "with almost no downtime, a true sense of cooperation, and constant challenge, RMG is an MMO that never grows stale" scoring the game 78% overall.

References

External links
Official website
Realm of the Mad God Remastered

2011 video games
Active massively multiplayer online games
Massively multiplayer online role-playing games
Browser games
Browser-based multiplayer online games
Flash games
Free-to-play video games
Shooter video games
Windows games
MacOS games
Video games developed in Estonia
Video games developed in Germany
Video games developed in Canada
Video games developed in the United States
Spry Fox games
Kabam games